Norman DeBlois Houghton (February 3, 1909 – March 4, 1998) was a magician, who was best known as the creator of the card sleight known as the Flushtration Count.

Houghton was born in Canada, settled in Toronto and joined the Canadian Army during World War II, serving in Italy.

References

Canadian magicians
1909 births
1998 deaths